Sarandí is a city in the Avellaneda Partido of the urban agglomeration of Greater Buenos Aires, Argentina. It is located to the south of the Autonomous City of Buenos Aires.

The main economical activity in the area is the production of leather goods. The leather industry, especially the tanning process, is often criticized for its contamination of the Riachuelo River.

The city was named after a native bush called sarandí (Cephalanthus glabratus).

Sport
Sarandí is home to Arsenal de Sarandí, a football club that currently plays in the Argentine first division.

References 

Populated places in Buenos Aires Province
Avellaneda Partido
Cities in Argentina
Argentina